The Shastan (or Sastean) family consisted of four languages, spoken in present-day northern California and southern Oregon:

 Konomihu (†)
 New River Shasta (†)
 Okwanuchu (†)
 Shasta (also known as Shastika) (†)

Konomihu appears to have been the most divergent Shastan language. Okwanuchu may have been a dialect of Shasta proper, which is known to have had a number of dialects.

The entire Shastan family is now extinct. Shasta was the last language that was spoken. Three elderly speakers were reported in the 1980s.

Shastan has often been considered to be in the hypothetical Hokan stock.

References 

Mithun, Marianne, ed. The Languages of Native North America. Cambridge: Cambridge University Press, 1999.

External links

 Native Tribes, Groups, Language Families and Dialects of California in 1770 (after Kroeber)

 
Language families
Hokan languages
Indigenous languages of California
Indigenous languages of Oregon
L